Tamazulapam del Espíritu Santo  is a town and municipality in Oaxaca in south-western Mexico. The municipality is at an altitude of 2,040 meters. It is part of the Sierra Mixe district within the Sierra Norte de Oaxaca Region.

The municipality has a total population of  6,908, and the town has a population of 2,372.

Municipal President Artemio Ortiz Ricardez died on May 13, 2020 during the COVID-19 pandemic in Mexico. The town had been placed under quarantine after its first reported case on May 10.

References

Municipalities of Oaxaca